Magomedrasul Musayevich Idrisov (born 8 July 1996) is a Russian freestyle wrestler. He won the silver medal in the men's freestyle 61 kg event at the 2019 World Wrestling Championships held in Nur-Sultan, Kazakhstan.

Career 

In 2018, he won the gold medal in the men's freestyle 61 kg event both at the 2018 World U23 Wrestling Championship and the 2018 European U23 Wrestling Championship. At the 2018 Russian National Freestyle Wrestling Championships held in Odintsovo, Moscow Oblast, Russia, he won the 61 kg event.

At the Golden Grand Prix Ivan Yarygin 2019 held in Krasnoyarsk, Russia, he won the gold medal in the men's freestyle 61 kg event.

Major results

References

External links 
 

Living people
1996 births
Sportspeople from Dagestan
Russian male sport wrestlers
World Wrestling Championships medalists
20th-century Russian people
21st-century Russian people